Parisii may refer to two ancient Iron Age tribes:

Parisii (Gaul)
Parisii (Yorkshire)

See also
Belgae